The 1940 Western Kentucky State Teachers Hilltoppers football team represented Western Kentucky State Teachers College (now known as Western Kentucky University) as a member of the Southern Intercollegiate Athletic Association (SIAA) during the 1940 college football season. Led by third-year head coach Gander Terry, the Hilltoppers compiled an overall record of 7–1–1 with a mark of 4–1–1 in conference play. Howard "Tip" Downing, Vernon Dulaney, Johnny Taylor, and Leslie Van Meter were named to the All-Kentucky Team.

Schedule

References

Western Kentucky State Teachers
Western Kentucky Hilltoppers football seasons
Western Kentucky State Teachers Hilltoppers football